Mimozotale minuta is a species of beetle in the family Cerambycidae. It was described by Pic in 1926. It is known from Vietnam.

References

Desmiphorini
Beetles described in 1926